Saipal is a mountain in the Himalayas of north-west Bajhang district in Nepal.

Api, Nampa and Saipal are a trio of high mountains located in northwestern Nepal. Together they form a small range of sharp, icy peaks, rising from a long, steep, snowy crest.

See also
 List of Ultras of the Himalayas

References

Seven-thousanders of the Himalayas
Mountains of the Sudurpashchim Province